Linda Djougang (born 17 May 1996) is an Irish rugby player from Balbriggan, Co Dublin. She plays for Old Belvedere, Leinster and Ireland women's national rugby union team. She works fulltime as a nurse in Dublin.

Background
Djougang moved to Ireland from Douala in Cameroon at the age of 9. She grew up in Rush, Dublin where she attended Rush and Lusk Educate Together National School. She studied general nursing at Trinity College Dublin from 2015 to 2020. She worked as a part-time care assistant from 2016 to 2020. She also worked as an intern at Grant Thornton International. In 2020, she began working at Tallaght University Hospital. Djougang speaks English and French fluently.

Rugby career
Djougang began playing rugby at the age of 17 when a friend invited her to a game of tag rugby.

It was not until she was in university at Trinity College Dublin, while on a work placement, that she first encountered rugby. She was spotted playing ‘tag rugby’ in Wanderers RFC whose team manager Michelle Byrne invited her to join the club.

A year after starting with Wanderers she got a trial with Leinster. She took a year out of college in 2017 to concentrate on rugby and moved to All Ireland League club Old Belvedere in order to get experience at the top level. In 2018 she made her inter-provincial debut for Leinster, versus Ulster.

She soon began playing for Wanderers Rugby Club before moving to Old Belvedere.  She has also played for the Dublin University Football Club.

In December 2019 she scored a try for Leinster against Harlequins in the first women’s club game to be played in Twickenham.

Djougang originally played as a blindside flanker before moving to loosehead prop and then tighthead prop. As of 2021, she has 12 caps for Ireland. She has scored 1 Six Nations try and a total of 5 Six Nations points.

Awards
 2021 Energia Women's Rugby Award - nominee
 2020 Zurich Women's XV Player of the Year - nominee
 2019 Trinity Sports Person of the Year - winner

References

External links 
 https://www.irishrugby.ie/women/linda-djougang/

Living people
Ireland women's international rugby union players
Alumni of Trinity College Dublin
Sportspeople from Fingal
Irish nurses
Old Belvedere R.F.C. players
Wanderers F.C. (rugby union) players
Leinster Rugby women's players
Irish people of Cameroonian descent
Irish sportspeople of African descent
Cameroonian emigrants to Ireland
Black Irish sportspeople
1996 births